Faridpur  is a major city located in the Faridpur District, Dhaka Division, Bangladesh. It is a major commercial hub in Southern Bangladesh. It is the second most important district & largest municipality in Dhaka Division in city proper wise.  It has an area of 66.31 km2 and a population of 557,632.  Faridpur is Bangladesh's proposed ninth division & thirteenth city corporation.

References

Populated places in Faridpur District
Cities in Bangladesh